Big Spring State Park is a  Pennsylvania state park in Toboyne Township, Perry County, Pennsylvania in the United States. Big Spring State Park is a hiking and picnic area. A partially completed railroad tunnel in Conococheague Mountain is a feature of the park.

History
The area surrounding Big Spring State Park is now largely a wild area. This was not the case in the 19th century. One of the first businesses at the foot of Conococheague Mountain was a tannery. This tannery was in operation from the early 19th century until 1860. The tannery was converted into an axe handle factory in 1871. The Perry Lumber Railroad, a narrow gauge railway also operated in the area. It hauled lumber to tanneries, barrel manufacturers and charcoal furnaces.

The abandoned railroad tunnel is a remnant of the lumber era that dominated the economy of much of Pennsylvania in the 19th century. The Newport and Shermans Valley Railroad extended its line into the Big Spring area in an attempt to connect with the Path Valley Railroad on the other side of Conococheague Mountain in Franklin County. This tunnel was left incomplete and stands as a reminder of the lumber/railroad era.

Although the railroad may have failed in its effort to tunnel through the mountain, the tracks remained. These rails were used to transport picnickers into the area during the early 20th century. The current facilities at Big Spring State Park were built during the Great Depression in the 1930s by the Civilian Conservation Corps. It was formally opened in 1936.

Recreation
Big Spring State Park offers recreational opportunities to those interested in picnicking and hiking. The pavilions built by the CCC and picnic tables are available in many areas of the park. A one-mile trail leads to the abandoned railroad tunnel in Conococheague Mountain. The park also serves as a trailhead for the Iron Horse Trail in Tuscarora State Forest.

Nearby state parks
The following state parks are within  of Big Spring State Park:
Caledonia State Park (Adams and Franklin Counties)
Colonel Denning State Park (Cumberland County)
Cowans Gap State Park (Fulton County)
Fowlers Hollow State Park (Perry County)
Greenwood Furnace State Park (Huntingdon County)
Kings Gap Environmental Education and Training Center (Cumberland County)
Little Buffalo State Park (Perry County)
Mont Alto State Park (Franklin County)
Pine Grove Furnace State Park (Cumberland County)
Trough Creek State Park (Huntingdon County)

References

External links

  

Big Spring State Park
Protected areas established in 1936
Civilian Conservation Corps in Pennsylvania
Parks in Perry County, Pennsylvania
1936 establishments in Pennsylvania
Protected areas of Perry County, Pennsylvania